Chetone malankiatae is a moth of the family Erebidae. It was described by Strand in 1921. It is found in Peru.

References

Chetone
Moths described in 1921